Vittorino Milanesio (born 28 June 1953) is a former Italian sprinter who competed at the 1976 Summer Olympics.

References

External links
 

1953 births
Athletes (track and field) at the 1976 Summer Olympics
Italian male sprinters
Olympic athletes of Italy
Living people